Nomorhamphus weberi is a species of viviparous halfbeak endemic to Lake Matano in Sulawesi, Indonesia.  This species can reach a length of  SL. The specific name honours the Dutch ichthyologist Max Carl Wilhelm Weber (1852-1937).

References

weberi
Freshwater fish of Indonesia
Endemic fauna of Indonesia
Taxonomy articles created by Polbot